Eva Helene Nansen (née Sars; 17 December 1858 – 9 December 1907) was a celebrated Norwegian mezzo-soprano singer. She was also a pioneer of women's skiing.

Personal life
Born in Christiania (now Oslo), she was a daughter of priest and professor of zoology Michael Sars (1805–1869) and his wife Maren Sars (1811–1898), and sister to biologist Georg Ossian Sars and historian Ernst Sars. Through her mother, she was a niece of poet and critic Johan Sebastian and writer Elisabeth Welhaven, a first cousin of architect Hjalmar Welhaven and police chief Kristian Welhaven and a granddaughter of priest Johan Sebastian Cammermeyer.

In September 1889 she married Fridtjof Nansen, the polar explorer and later winner of the Nobel peace prize for his work with refugees. They had several children, including Odd Nansen, a notable architect. She died of pneumonia on 9 December 1907 at Lysaker.

Career

Eva Sars studied singing for five years with her sister Mally and her brother-in-law, baritone singer and composer Thorvald Lammers. Her debut as an operatic singer came in 1881, in the Musikforeningen, a forerunner of the Oslo Philharmonic. She studied with Désirée Artôt in Berlin in 1886 and 1887. She specialized in the romance song form, and made her concert debut as a mezzo-soprano romance singer in 1886. She appeared at numerous concerts, nationally and internationally, between 1880 and 1900. Included in her opera repertoire were "Elsa's Dream" from Wagner's Lohengrin and "Gretchen" in Schumann's Scenes from Goethe's Faust. Her Scandinavian concert tours together with pianist Erika Lie Nissen were met with great enthusiasm. She was regarded as one of Norway's most prominent romance singers. Her last public concert was in December 1899, when she performed the newly composed Haugtussa song cycle, based by Edvard Grieg on Arne Garborg's poems.

She also contributed musically to gatherings in her mother's home, which before 1898 was a meeting place for liberals and intellectuals; it has been called "Christiania's first salon".

Ski pioneer

Eva Sars (Nansen) was a competent skier. She and Cecilie Thoresen Krog drew attention as the only girls at the Husebyrennet ski jumping event, when they arrived on skis. Later she came to have great influence on gaining the right for women to participate in winter sports on equal terms with men. During Easter 1892 she probably became the first woman to cross the Hardangervidda mountain plateau on skis, when she did so with her husband Fridtjof Nansen. On this occasion she wore a somewhat challenging ski costume for the time, designed by Nansen and made by her, in which her skirt only reached slightly below the knees. In the article Skiløbningen, published in the newspaper Verdens Gang in March 1893, she argued against those who moralized against female skiing.

References

1858 births
1907 deaths
Deaths from pneumonia in Norway
19th-century Norwegian women opera singers
Musicians from Oslo